Saraswati Mandir, also known as Sarika Sadan or Narmad House, is a writer's house museum in Surat, Gujarat, India. It was built by Gujarati poet Narmad in 1866. In 2015, the house was renovated and converted into museum and memorial house dedicated to Narmad.

History
He started construction of new house along with renovation of old one in January 1866 which was completed in September 1866. He named it Saraswati Mandir and used it for writing and research. The construction of house exacerbated his financial problem.

The house was later purchased by Jatashankar Trivedi. Subsequently, it was purchased by Gajendrashankar Lalshankar Pandya as his eldest daughter Sarika insisted to purchase it. He expanded the house and constructed extension in the southern one-third part and added tin roof above the house. He renamed it Sarika Sadan after the name of his eldest daughter. After his death, his wife Kailash continued to reside there. They wanted to sell the house but the local residents and Narmad's fans opposed and wanted it to be converted into museum or library. The Surat Municipal Corporation purchased it and handed over it to Kavi Narmad Yugavart Trust which was dedicated to publication and preservation of works of Narmad, on 24 August 1992, the birth anniversary of Narmad. They partially restored and converted it into memorial but later handed it back to Surat Municipal Corporation. The house stayed neglected until some renovation in 2010s.

The Surat Municipal Corporation started renovation, restoration and preservation of house to its original form in 2014. They removed the extension and replaced decayed wooden parts, roof and flooring. The renovated house was converted into museum and articles and information about Narmad's life, family and works are put on display. The ground floor has the bust of Narmad. It also houses his books and some furniture used by him. The project cost .

The museum was opened to public on 24 August 2015, 182nd birth anniversary of Narmad.

Replica 
It was also opened on 24 August 2015. It houses handwritten manuscripts and some belongings of Narmad.

Architecture
It had framework made of wood and the walls made of bricks. The walls were plastered with limestone. Its floor was tiled with Kota stone with shiny finish. It had sloped roof with Mangalore tiles.

See also
List of tourist attractions in Surat

References

External links 
 Short documentary on house before its renovation
 Slideshow on house after its renovation, narrated in Gujarati by its former owner's son.
 Short Documentary on Sarika Sadan by SCET students

Museums established in 2015
Houses completed in 1866
Poetry museums
Literary museums
Biographical museums in India
Tourist attractions in Surat
Culture of Surat
Writers' centres and houses
Historic house museums in India
Museums in Gujarat